Atiq Ahmed (born 11 June 1986) is a Pakistani cricketer. He played in 25 first-class matches between 2004 and 2013. He made his Twenty20 debut on 25 April 2005, for Multan Tigers in the 2004–05 National Twenty20 Cup.

References

External links
 

1986 births
Living people
Pakistani cricketers
Bahawalpur cricketers
Multan cricketers